KHTML is a browser engine developed by the KDE project. It is the default engine of the Konqueror browser, but it has not been actively worked on since 2016. Moreover, KHTML will be discontinued for KDE Frameworks 6.

Built on the KParts framework and written in C++, KHTML had relatively good support for Web standards during its prime. Engines forked from KHTML are used by some of the world's most widely used browsers, among them Google Chrome, Safari, Opera, Vivaldi, and Microsoft Edge.

History

Origins
KHTML was preceded by an earlier engine called khtmlw or the KDE HTML Widget, developed by Torben Weis and Martin Jones, which implemented support for HTML 3.2, HTTP 1.0, and HTML frames, but not the W3C DOM, CSS, or JavaScript.

KHTML itself came into existence on November 4, 1998, as a fork of the khtmlw library, with some slight refactoring and the addition of Unicode support and changes to support the move to Qt 2. Waldo Bastian was among those who did the work of creating that early version of KHTML.

Re-write and improvement
The real work on KHTML actually started between May and October 1999, with the realization that the choice facing the project was "either do a significant effort to move KHTML forward or to use Mozilla" and with adding support for JavaScript as the highest priority. So in May 1999, Lars Knoll began doing research with an eye toward implementing the W3C DOM specification, finally announcing on August 16, 1999 that he had checked in what amounted to a complete rewrite of the KHTML library—changing KHTML to use the standard W3C DOM as its internal document representation. That in turn allowed the beginnings of JavaScript support to be added in October 1999, with the integration of Harri Porten's KJS following shortly afterwards.

In the closing months of 1999 and first few months of 2000, Knoll did further work with Antti Koivisto and Dirk Mueller to add CSS support and to refine and stabilize the KHTML architecture, with most of that work being completed by March 2000. Among other things, those changes enabled KHTML to become the second browser after Internet Explorer to correctly support Hebrew and Arabic and languages written right-to-left—before Mozilla had such support.

KDE 2.0 was the first KDE release (on October 23, 2000) to include KHTML (as the rendering engine of the new Konqueror file and web browser, which replaced the monolithic KDE File Manager).

Other modules
KSVG was first developed in 2001 by Nikolas Zimmermann and Rob Buis; however, by 2003, it was decided to fork the then-current KSVG implementation into two new projects: KDOM/KSVG2 (to improve the state of DOM rendering in KHTML underneath a more formidable SVG 1.0 render state) and Kcanvas (to abstract any rendering done within khtml/ksvg2 in a single shared library, with multiple backends for it, e.g., Cairo/Qt, etc.).

KSVG2 is also a part of WebKit.

Sunsetting
KHTML is set to be removed in KDE Frameworks 6. It has not had active development since 2016, just the necessary maintenance to work with updates to Frameworks 5.

Standards compliance
The following standards are supported by the KHTML engine:

 HTML 4.01
 HTML 5 support
 CSS 1
 CSS 2.1 (screen and paged media)
 CSS 3 Selectors (fully as of KDE 3.5.6)
 CSS 3 Other (multiple backgrounds, box-sizing and text-shadow)
 PNG, MNG, JPEG, GIF graphic formats
 DOM 1, 2 and partially 3
 ECMA-262/JavaScript 1.5
 Partial Scalable Vector Graphics support

Descendants

KHTML and KJS were adopted by Apple in 2002 for use in the Safari web browser. Apple publishes the source code for their fork of the KHTML engine, called WebKit. In 2013, Google began development on a fork of WebKit, called Blink.

See also

 
 Comparison of browser engines

References

External links
 Web Browser – the Konqueror website
 KHTML – KDE's HTML library – description at developer.kde.org
 KHTML at the KDE API Reference
 KHTML at the KDE git repository
 KHTML bugs fixed in the last year (self-updating query)
 From KDE to WebKit: The Open Source Engine That's Here to Stay – presentation at Yahoo! office by Lars Knoll and George Staikos on December 8, 2006 (video)

1999 software
Free layout engines
Free software programmed in C++
KDE Frameworks
KDE Platform